John Raymond Garamendi (born January 24, 1945) is an American businessman, politician, and member of the Democratic Party who has represented areas of Northern California between San Francisco and Sacramento, including the cities of Fairfield and Suisun City, in the United States House of Representatives since 2009. Garamendi was the California insurance commissioner from 1991 to 1995 and 2003 to 2007, the U.S. Deputy Secretary of the Interior from 1995 to 1998, and the 46th lieutenant governor of California from 2007 until his election to Congress in late 2009.

Garamendi was born in Camp Blanding, Florida, and raised in Mokelumne Hill, California. He earned a B.A. in business from the University of California, Berkeley, and an MBA from Harvard Business School, then served in the Peace Corps in Ethiopia from 1966 to 1968. He was elected to the California State Assembly in 1974, serving a single term before being elected in 1976 to the California State Senate, where he served four terms until 1990. During this time he had a spell as Majority Leader and ran unsuccessfully for the Democratic nominations for governor of California in 1982 and California State Controller in 1986.

In 1990, Garamendi became the first elected California insurance commissioner, serving from 1991 to 1995. He ran for governor in the 1994 election, losing in the Democratic primary. He left public office and served as President Bill Clinton's deputy secretary of the interior from 1995 to 1998, then worked for the Peace Corps again. He was elected insurance commissioner again in 2002 and briefly ran for governor again in the 2003 recall, before dropping out to support Lieutenant Governor Cruz Bustamante. In 2006, he was elected lieutenant governor to succeed the term-limited Bustamante.

Garamendi had planned to run for governor a fourth time in 2010, but after U.S. Representative Ellen Tauscher of  resigned to become under secretary of state for arms control and international security, Garamendi won the November 2009 special election to succeed her.

Early life and education
Garamendi was born in Camp Blanding, Florida, and was raised in Mokelumne Hill, California, the son of Mary Jane (née McSorley) and Raymond V. Garamendi. His paternal grandparents were Basque immigrants from Spain and his mother was of half Irish and half Italian ancestry. Garamendi received a Bachelor of Arts in business from the University of California, Berkeley, where he was a football player and wrestler, and a Master of Business Administration degree from Harvard Business School. He served in the Peace Corps in Ethiopia from 1966 to 1968. Garamendi is an Eagle Scout and a member of Sigma Chi, as a brother of the Alpha Beta Chapter at Berkeley.

California legislature (1974–1991)

State Assembly
In 1974, Garamendi decided to run for California's 7th State Assembly district. Six-term Republican incumbent William T. Bagley did not run for reelection, instead running for California State Controller. In the election to succeed Bagley, Garamendi faced Republican State Assemblyman Douglas F. Carter. Carter had won a special election in the 12th Assembly district in July 1973 to succeed Robert T. Monagan. In the general election, Garamendi defeated Carter, 60,380 votes (64.08%) to 33,842 (35.92%), as Democrats won a supermajority in the California State Assembly for the first time since the 1800s.

State Senate
In 1976, Garamendi decided to retire after one term to run in California's 13th State Senate district. He defeated Republican Bob Whitten, 53% to 47%. He was reelected in 1980 (60%), 1984 (69%), and 1988 (69%).

While in the California Senate, Garamendi served as Majority Leader. He chaired the Joint Committee on Science and Technology, the Senate Health and Welfare Committee, and the Senate Revenue and Taxation Committee.

1982 gubernatorial election

Garamendi first ran for governor of California in 1982. In the Democratic primary, Los Angeles Mayor Tom Bradley defeated him, 61% to 25%.

1986 controller election
In the 1986 Democratic primary for California State Controller, Garamendi lost to Assemblyman Gray Davis, 50% to 38%.

Insurance commissioner (1991–1995)

1990 election
Garamendi first ran for California Insurance Commissioner in 1990. He won the Democratic primary with a plurality of 36% of the vote. His closest challenger was radio talk show host Bill Press, who got 28% of the vote. In the general election, he defeated Republican Wes Bannister, 52% to 38%.

Tenure
In 1991, while serving as California Insurance Commissioner, Garamendi seized Executive Life, a failing life insurance company, and resold it to French investors who turned out to be fronts for a government-owned French bank. They made billions of dollars selling off the company's portfolio of junk bonds while the Californians with Executive Life policies were very negatively affected. This became a scandal in both the U.S. and France, with the U.S. government filing criminal charges, because it was illegal for a government-owned bank to own a U.S. insurer. Policyholders blamed Garamendi for putting them in this position.

Eventually the U.S. government reached a settlement with the French bankers, and in 2005 Garamendi agreed to a settlement, the terms of which further angered Executive Life policyholders, who, according to the Sacramento Bee, "had been damaged to the tune of perhaps $5 billion." A leader of the policyholders' interest group, Sue Watson, said, "We are shocked and outraged that the largest financial fraud in California history would be settled for so little and without even a fight." The Bee editorialized that "Garamendi cannot simultaneously assert that the sale was a good deal and a multibillion-dollar fraud, and then defend a cents-on-the-dollar settlement that left the buyers with billions of dollars in windfall profits. It just does not make sense."

1994 gubernatorial election

Garamendi ran for California governor a second time in 1994. In the Democratic primary, State Treasurer Kathleen Brown defeated him, 48% to 33%.

1995–2003
After Garamendi's tenure as insurance commissioner, President Bill Clinton appointed him Deputy Secretary of the Interior, the second-highest post in the U.S. Department of the Interior. He resigned in 1998 and worked with the Peace Corps. He then spent time in the private sector.

Insurance commissioner (2003–2007)

2002 election

Garamendi ran for California insurance commissioner for a second time in 2002. He won the Democratic primary with 39% of the vote. In the general election, he defeated Republican Gary Mendoza 46% to 42%.

2003 gubernatorial election

On August 7, 2003, Garamendi announced his candidacy for governor a third time in the gubernatorial recall election, but dropped out two days later to endorse Lieutenant Governor Cruz Bustamante.

Lieutenant governor (2007–2009)

2006 election

On July 16, 2004, Garamendi announced his candidacy for lieutenant governor of California. He was endorsed by former Vice President Al Gore, the Sierra Club, the California Teachers Association, the California League of Conservation Voters, the Peace Officers Research Association of California, the California Professional Firefighters Association, former U.S. Senate Majority Leader Tom Daschle, and former U.S. Interior Secretary Bruce Babbitt. Garamendi won the Democratic primary by defeating state senators Jackie Speier and Liz Figueroa 43% to 40% to 18%. In the general election, he defeated Republican state senator Tom McClintock 49% to 45%.

U.S. House of Representatives (2009–present)

Elections

2009 special 

Despite living outside California's 10th congressional district, Garamendi announced his intention to run for the 2009 special election there after Representative Ellen Tauscher vacated her seat. There was some confusion about the location of Garamendi's residence. Garamendi said: "My front yard is in the district, our bedroom is not." He continued to fuel speculation about his residence when he said the same thing to The New York Times in July. The Sacramento Board of Elections later confirmed that no part of Garamendi's property is within the 10th congressional district.

In the September election, no candidate reached the 50% threshold to avoid a runoff. Garamendi ranked first among Democrats with 26% of the vote, defeating State Senator Mark DeSaulnier (18%) and Assemblymember Joan Buchanan (12%). In the November runoff, Garamendi defeated Republican nominee David Harmer, 53% to 43%. Garamendi was sworn in as a member of the House of Representatives on November 5, 2009.

2010 

Garamendi was reelected to his first full term, defeating Republican nominee Gary Clift 59% to 38%.

2012 

After redistricting, Garamendi filed papers in March 2012 to run in the newly redrawn 3rd district.

Garamendi was running in a district that was over 77% new to him. While the old 10th district traditionally favored Democrats, the new 3rd was somewhat more of a swing district. But the bulk of its vote was in Democratic-leaning territory between the Bay Area and Sacramento, Garamendi's base. Garamendi defeated Republican Kim Vann 54.2% to 45.8%.

2014 

Garamendi was reelected.

Political positions

Abortion
Garamendi supports abortion access for everyone. He called Roe v. Wade a "fundamental human right to bodily autonomy". He opposed the 2022 overturning of Roe v. Wade, calling the decision "devastating".

Donald Trump
Garamendi was critical of President Donald Trump, suggesting in December 2016 that because of his international real-estate business, Trump was weighed down by conflicts of interest. He also said he was disturbed by the placement of "generals, ex-generals in every one of the key positions dealing with the military, dealing with international affairs."

At a July 2017 town hall in Davis, Garamendi said that developments in the Trump administration were "far more serious" than Watergate.

In July 2017, Garamendi said that during recent visits to Vietnam, South Korea, and Australia, he had encountered "angst, worry and concern about what's happening in America."

Garamendi said in January 2018 that he was "angry" when Trump referred to certain Third World nations as "shithole countries".

Environment
On February 24, 2019, Garamendi announced on Facebook that he had become a co-sponsor of H.Res.109, also known as the Green New Deal. This decision came after pressure from community members. The post read, "I welcome the energy and commitment of the supporters of H.Res.109, and I join with them as I continue my decades-long effort to stop Climate Change and save our planet."

In late 2022, Garamendi introduced a bill to strengthen the Jones Act when dismantling offshore oil&gas platforms and installing offshore wind farms. Industry commentators noted the risk of delaying such projects and/or increasing their costs due to lack of US vessels and personnel.

Health care
On December 9, 2021, Garamendi became a cosponsor of H.R.1976, the Medicare for All Act of 2021.

Joe Biden
As of November 2021, Garamendi had voted in line with President Joe Biden's stated position 100% of the time.

Economic policy

In January 2018, Garamendi called the Tax Cuts and Jobs Act of 2017 a "tax scam" that would primarily benefit the so-called "1 percent". He asserted that House "deficit hawks" wanted to "cut out the social safety net" to pay for the bill.

In a January 2018 interview, Garamendi said of the U.S. treasury: "There's no money. They gave it all away." He complained that current economic policies, including the large 2017 tax cuts, benefited the rich and corporations, not the middle class.

Immigration
In January 2018, Garamendi expressed the desire to "make sure every person is identified" and charged that E-Verify, a system intended to curtail undocumented employment, had "not really been enforced". He said that it was possible to compromise on the issue between conservative and progressive House members, and expressed concern about the fate of "undocumented immigrants who are not considered Dreamers."

Internet privacy
After Mark Zuckerberg's April 2018 testimony before a joint Senate committee, Garamendi called for a privacy law that would cover social media.

Military

In May 2011, by a vote of 60–1, the House Armed Services Committee approved a $553 billion military funding bill that would increase pay and fund new aircraft, ships, and submarines. Garamendi cast the sole "no" vote. The same month, he introduced an amendment to the National Defense Authorization Act that would withdraw 90% of troops from Afghanistan by the end of 2013. Along with eight other members of Congress he wrote a letter to President Obama asking him to end the war.

With Dianne Feinstein and Martin Heinrich, Garamendi sponsored the Due Process Guarantee Act, a 2012 bill that would bar the military from indefinitely detaining U.S. citizens or residents within the country without charge or trial.

Garmendi actively opposed a GOP-backed construction of a missile defense site on the East Coast, saying it was fiscally irresponsible to be "spending up to $5 billion in the next three years on a missile defense system that doesn't work."

He voted against extending the Patriot Act.

National security
In a May 2011 article, Garamendi wrote, "our national security is much more dependent on ending desperate poverty, funding good schools, and empowering women in the developing world while eradicating international terrorist networks like al Qaeda. With bin Laden dead and al Qaeda in Afghanistan largely extinguished, it's time we revisited the wisdom of continuing the war in Afghanistan."

In April 2018, he expressed opposition to building a border wall and said, "If you want to go where the problem is, fund the Coast Guard."

Student loans
In the fall of 2017, Garamendi and Brian Fitzpatrick co-introduced H.R. 4001, the Student Loan Refinancing and Recalculating Act. "For many Americans, the price of a college education is too high," he said.

Syria
On November 19, 2015, Garamendi voted for HR 4038, legislation that would effectively halt the resettlement of refugees from Syria and Iraq to the United States.

On March 31, 2018, he described Trump's approach to Syria as "helter-skelter" and "chaos". In April 2018, he expressed opposition to a military strike on Syria. "You have to have a strategy. This president doesn't have a clue about how to build a strategy."

Water supply
In a June 2017 article, Garamendi rejected the proposal known as California WaterFix, calling it an "expensive boondoggle", and instead expressed support for Proposition 1.

Committee assignments
 Committee on Armed Services
Subcommittee on Readiness (chair)
 Subcommittee on Strategic Forces
 Committee on Transportation and Infrastructure
Subcommittee on Coast Guard and Maritime Transportation
Subcommittee on Economic Development, Public Buildings, and Emergency Management
Subcommittee on Highways and Transit
Subcommittee on Water Resources and Environment

Caucus memberships
 House Democratic Caucus
 Congressional Progressive Caucus
American Sikh Caucus (co-chair)
Air Force Caucus
Alzheimer's Task Force
Blue Collar Caucus
Military Families Caucus
 Peace Corps Caucus (co-chair)
Shipbuilding Caucus
Sustainable Energy and Environment Coalition
United States Congressional International Conservation Caucus
 Veterinary Medicine Caucus
Wine Caucus

Electoral history

Personal life
Garamendi is married to Patricia Wilkinson, who has worked as agriculture specialist for the California Exposition and State Fair and as deputy secretary of California's Business, Transportation and Housing Agency. President Clinton appointed her to serve as associate director of the Peace Corps in 1993 and as deputy administrator in the Department of Agriculture, Foreign Agricultural Service in 1998. Garamendi and Wilkinson live in Walnut Grove and have six children and 13 grandchildren.

See also
 List of Hispanic and Latino Americans in the United States Congress
 List of minority governors and lieutenant governors in the United States

References

External links

 Congressman John Garamendi official U.S. House website
 John Garamendi for Congress campaign website
 
 

|-

|-

|-

|-

|-

|-

|-

|-

|-

|-

1945 births
20th-century American politicians
21st-century American politicians
American people of Basque descent
American people of Irish descent
American people of Italian descent
California Golden Bears football players
California Insurance Commissioners
Democratic Party California state senators
Candidates in the 1982 United States elections
Candidates in the 1986 United States elections
Candidates in the 1994 United States elections
Haas School of Business alumni
Harvard Business School alumni
Lieutenant Governors of California
Living people
Democratic Party members of the California State Assembly
Democratic Party members of the United States House of Representatives from California
Peace Corps volunteers
People from Clay County, Florida
People from Sacramento County, California
People from Walnut Grove, California
United States Deputy Secretaries of the Interior
University of California regents
American people of Spanish descent